Mount Halimun is a mountain in the island of Java, Indonesia. It is protected by the Mount Halimun Salak National Park. It is Banten's highest point.

Location

Mount Halimun is in the volcanic belt of the Bandung Zone.
It is a stratovolcano formed during the Pleistocene.
It is on the border between Banten province and West Java province.

Environment

The mountain lies within the largest area of primary rainforest in Java.
The word Halimun means "foggy" or "misty" in the Sundanese language, and is given to two of the peaks in the national park, but is commonly applied to the higher north peak.
Much of the forest on the mountain is almost always enclosed in cloud.
The Ci Durian river rises on the slopes of the mountain and flows northward through the Banten region.
The Cisadane river also rises in the park.
The park is a critical area for survival of the silvery gibbon.

Climbing

A permit is required to enter the Mount Halimun Salak National Park.
Technically the route to the summit is not considered an "official climbing lane" by the National Park, so climbing is not allowed.

Notes

Sources

External links

Mountains of West Java
Mountains of Banten